A general election was held in the U.S. state of Arkansas on November 4, 2014. All of Arkansas' executive officers were up for election as well as a United States Senate seat, and all of Arkansas' four seats in the United States House of Representatives. Primary elections were held on May 20, 2014, for offices that need to nominate candidates. Primary runoffs, necessary if no candidate wins a majority of the vote, were held on June 10, 2014.

Governor

Incumbent Democratic Governor Mike Beebe was term-limited and could not run for re-election to a third term as governor.

Democratic nominee former U.S. Representative Mike Ross, Republican nominee former U.S Representative Asa Hutchinson, Green nominee Josh Drake and Libertarian nominee Frank Gilbert contested in the general election.

Results

Lieutenant Governor
The office of Lieutenant Governor has been vacant since Republican Mark Darr resigned on February 1, 2014, under investigation for ethics violations involving illegal use of campaign funds. In Arkansas, the Governor and Lieutenant Governor are elected separately.

Republican primary
U.S. Representative Tim Griffin, State Representative Debra Hobbs and State Representative Andy Mayberry ran for the Republican nomination. State Representative Charlie Collins had been in the race, but he withdrew after Griffin's entry.

Former State Highway Commissioner John Burkhalter ran for the Democrats. Little Rock School Board President Dianne Curry had been running, but she withdrew from the race.

Libertarian Chris Olson also ran.

General election

Attorney General
Incumbent Democratic Attorney General Dustin McDaniel was term-limited and could not run for re-election to a third term in office.

State Representative Nate Steel ran for the Democrats. Attorney Zac White, who had considered running, endorsed Steel and instead ran for the State Senate.

Republican primary
Three attorneys sought the Republican nomination: Patricia Nation, Leslie Rutledge and David Sterling. State Representative Matthew Shepherd, Faulkner County prosecutor J. Cody Hiland and Marvin Childers, a former state representative and president of the lobbying group The Poultry Federation, had considered running, but decided against it.

Since no candidate won a majority, Rutledge and Sterling contested a runoff, which was characterised as a "full-fledged street brawl." Outside groups spent hundreds of thousands of dollars on attack ads and both candidates "question[ed] each others' conservative credentials and political experience." Nation endorsed Rutledge, who handily defeated Sterling.

Libertarian Aaron Cash is also running.

General election
In September 2014, Pulaski County Clerk Larry Crane cancelled Rutledge's voter registration after it was revealed that she was registered to vote in several other states. Rutledge, who has an Arkansas voter registration card, had cancelled her Pulaski County voter registration in July 2008 and registered to vote in Washington, D.C. instead. However, she did not vote in any elections in D.C., instead voting via absentee ballot in the 2008 general election in Pulaski County. She then registered to vote in Virginia in September 2010. If she remains unregistered, she would be ineligible to serve as Attorney General as the Arkansas Constitution states "No persons shall be elected to, or appointed to fill a vacancy in, any office who does not possess the qualifications of an elector." Rutledge denounced Crane for using "partisan politics to disenfranchise a voter in an attempt to hijack an election." Crane responded that he "did what the law requires" and invited Rutledge to re-register.

Secretary of State
Incumbent Republican Secretary of State Mark Martin ran for re-election to a second term in office.

Arkansas Board of Election Commissioner and Pulaski County Election Commissioner Susan Inman ran for the Democrats.

Libertarian Jacob Holloway also ran.

General election

State Treasurer
Incumbent Democratic State Treasurer Charles Robinson, who served in the office from May 29, 2013, did not run for re-election, per the terms of his appointment. He was appointed to the office following the resignation of Martha Shoffner.

Accountant Karen Sealy Garcia ran for the Democrats.

Republican primary
The Republican primary was held between State Representative Duncan Baird and Saline County Circuit Clerk and former Chairman of the Republican Party of Arkansas Dennis Milligan.

Libertarian Chris Hayes also ran.

General election

State Auditor
Incumbent Democratic State Auditor Charlie Daniels chose to retire rather than run for re-election to a second term.

Regina Stewart Hampton, an employee in the Unclaimed Property Division of the State Auditor's Office, ran for the Democrats.

Republican primary
State Representative Andrea Lea and former campaign manager for Mark Martin Ken Yang sought the Republican nomination.

Libertarian Brian Leach also ran.

General election

Commissioner of State Lands
Incumbent Republican Commissioner of State Lands John Thurston ran for re-election to a second term in office.

Landscape architect Mark Robertson ran for the Democrats.

Libertarian Elvis D. Presley, an Elvis Presley impersonator and auto-mechanic, also ran.

General election

United States Senate

Incumbent Democratic Senator Mark Pryor ran for re-election to a third term. Republican Tom Cotton, Green Mark Swaney and Libertarian Nathan LaFrance also ran.

United States House of Representatives

All of Arkansas' four seats in the United States House of Representatives were up for election in 2014.

References

 
Arkansas